Elaphropus parvulus is a species of ground beetle in the family Carabidae. It is found in North America, Europe, temperate Asia, and Africa.

References

Further reading

External links

 

Elaphropus
Articles created by Qbugbot
Beetles described in 1831